Andrei Kovalenko (Андрій Коваленко; born 6 November 1970 in Kiev) is an Australian water polo player and current coach of the UWA Torpedoes Men's Water Polo team and coach of the u18 and u16 UWA City Beach Bears.
He competed for Australia at the 2000 Sydney Olympic Games, as well as for CIS at Barcelona 1992 in which he won a bronze medal and Ukraine at Atlanta 1996. In 2007 he helped Australia attain a bronze medal in the FINA Water Polo World League.

In recent years, Andrei has starting playing Men's Softball for the Woodlands Wolves Ball Club. Andrei has started to refine his pitching (underarm), and shown his skills in the outfield with his "Rocket for an Arm".
In the off season, Andrei has also started playing Baseball for the Wembley Magpies Baseball Club. Andrei is a reliable pitcher, picking up different variations with ease.

See also
 List of Olympic medalists in water polo (men)

References
 Australian Olympic Team (Handbook 2000 Olympic Games Sydney Australia)

External links
 

1970 births
Living people
Sportspeople from Kyiv
Soviet male water polo players
Ukrainian male water polo players
Australian male water polo players
Water polo players at the 1992 Summer Olympics
Water polo players at the 1996 Summer Olympics
Water polo players at the 2000 Summer Olympics
Olympic water polo players of the Unified Team
Olympic water polo players of Australia
Olympic water polo players of Ukraine
Olympic bronze medalists for the Unified Team
Ukrainian emigrants to Australia
Olympic medalists in water polo
Medalists at the 1992 Summer Olympics
Australian water polo coaches